An avalanche is a cascade of snow down a slope.

Avalanche may also refer to:

Places
 Avalanche, Wisconsin, unincorporated community, United States
 Avalanche Lake (disambiguation)
 Avalanche Peak (disambiguation)

Technology 
 Avalanche (blockchain platform), a decentralized, open-source blockchain with smart contract functionality.
 Avalanche (P2P), a proposed peer-to-peer network
 Avalanche (phishing group), a criminal syndicate which performs phishing attacks
 Avalanche breakdown, a form of electric current multiplication
 Avalanche diode
 Avalanche effect, a concept in cryptography
 Avalanche photodiode, a highly sensitive semiconductor device that converts an optical signal into an electrical signal
 Electron avalanche, a process similar to an avalanche breakdown, occurring without connection between two electrodes

Film and television
 Avalanche (1923 film), an Austrian film
 Avalanche (1928 film), an American silent western film
 Avalanche (1946 film), an American film directed by Irving Allen
 Avalanche (1951 film), a French film 
 Avalanche (1952 film), a Japanese film directed by Kaneto Shindō
 Avalanche (1969 film), a British film 
 Avalanche (1978 film), an American disaster film with Rock Hudson and Mia Farrow
 Avalanche (1994 film), a Canadian film
 Avalanche (1999 film), an American film directed by Steve Kroschel
 The Avalanche (1919 film), an American film
 The Avalanche (1946 film), a Czech film
 "Avalanche" (Captain Scarlet and the Mysterons), a 1967 episode of Captain Scarlet and the Mysterons
 Avalanche (G.I. Joe), a fictional character in the G.I. Joe universe

Music
 Avalanche (band), a 1980s Norwegian disco group
 The Avalanches, an Australian electronic music group

Albums
 Avalanche (EP), a 2000 EP by Echo & the Bunnymen
 Avalanche (Thea Gilmore album), 2003
 Avalanche (Matthew Good album), 2003, or the title song
 Avalanche (Some Velvet Sidewalk album), 1992
 Avalanche (British India album), 2010
 Avalanche (Mountain album), 1974
 Avalanche (Leah Andreone album), 2009
 The Avalanche (Sufjan Stevens album), 2006
 The Avalanche (Owen album), 2020
 Avalanche (Quadron album), 2013

Songs
 "Avalanche" (Bring Me the Horizon song), a song on Bring Me the Horizon's 2015 album That's the Spirit
 "Avalanche" (Leonard Cohen song), a song on Leonard Cohen's 1971 album Songs of Love and Hate
 "Avalanche" (Migos song), a song on Migos' 2021 album Culture III
 "Avalanche," a song on Ryan Adams's 2004 album Love Is Hell
 "Avalanche", a song on Arch Enemy's 2014 album War Eternal
 "Avalanche", a song on David Cook's 2008 album David Cook
 "Avalanche", a song on Marié Digby's 2009 album Breathing Underwater
 "Avalanche", a song on Disillusion's 2006 album Gloria
 "Avalanche", a song on Epica's 2012 album Requiem for the Indifferent
 "Avalanche", a song on The Ghost Inside's 2014 album Dear Youth
 "Avalanche", a song on Gigolo Aunts's 1988 album Everybody Happy
 "Avalanche", a song on Nick Jonas' 2014 album Nick Jonas
 "Avalanche", a song on Manafest's 2010 album The Chase
 "Avalanche," a song on Wintersleep's 2003 album Wintersleep
 "Avalanche", a song on Youngblood Brass Band's 2003 album Center:Level:Roar

Gaming
 Avalanche (video game), 1978 arcade game released by Atari
 Avalanche (marble game), mechanical abstract strategy game with marbles
 Avalanche: The Salerno Landings, 1976 board wargame
 Avalanche chess, chess variant
 Avalanche joseki, sequence in the game of Go
 Avalanche Press, producer of wargame and roleplaying game products
 Avalanche Software, American video game developer
 Avalanche Studios, Swedish video game developer
 AVALANCHE, fictional organization in Final Fantasy VII; see Characters of the Final Fantasy VII series

Sports
 Avalanche, a professional wrestling character portrayed by John Tenta
 Adelaide Avalanche, an Australia hockey team
 Alaska Avalanche, a US hockey team
 Colorado Avalanche, a US hockey team
 Denver Avalanche, a US soccer team
 Hamilton Avalanche, a Canada soccer team
 Salem Avalanche, a US baseball team
 Quebec Avalanche, a Canada hockey team

Transportation
 Chevrolet Avalanche, a sport utility truck
 HSV Avalanche SUV, a dual-cab utility vehicle
 Avalanche, a GWR Banking Class locomotive run by the Great Western Railway from 1846 to 1865
 Avalanche, a GWR 3031 Class locomotive that was built for and run on Great Western Railway between 1891 and 1915
 Gemballa Avalanche, a high-end automobile

Roller coasters
 Avalanche (Kings Dominion), a roller coaster at Kings Dominion
 Avalanche (Blackpool Pleasure Beach), a roller coaster at Pleasure Beach Blackpool

Other meanings
 Avalanche (comics), a Marvel Comics character
 Avalanche, a 1954 children's novel by Anna Rutgers van der Loeff
 Avalanche, a horse in Dragon Avenger, the second book in the Age of Fire series by E. E. Knight
 Avalanche, a 2007 story from the Railway Series book Thomas and Victoria
 Underwater avalanche (or undersea avalanche), synonyms sometimes used for turbidity currents

See also
 Operation Avalanche (disambiguation)
 Lavalas (disambiguation)
 Snowball effect, a metaphorical term for a process of gradual growth